Haji Ahmadov (born on 23 November 1993 in Baku) is an Azerbaijani football defender who plays for Zagatala.

Career
Ahmadov left Qarabağ at the end of the 2014–15 season.

Career statistics

Achievements
Baku
Azerbaijan Cup (1): 2009–10
Qarabağ
Azerbaijan Premier League (2): 2013–14, 2014–15
 Azerbaijan Cup (1): 2014–15

References

External links

1993 births
Living people
Azerbaijani footballers
Footballers from Baku
FC Baku players
Sumgayit FK players
Qarabağ FK players
Zira FK players
Azerbaijan Premier League players
Association football defenders
Azerbaijan youth international footballers
Azerbaijan under-21 international footballers
Azerbaijan international footballers